Castlewood may refer to:

Places

United States
 Castlewood, Colorado, a town
 Castlewood, South Dakota, a town
 Castlewood, Virginia, a city
 Castlewood High School
 Castlewood (Chesterfield, Virginia), a historic plantation listed on the National Register of Historic Places
 Castlewood State Park, near Ballwin, Missouri
 Castlewood Canyon State Park, near Franktown, Colorado

Canada
 Orangeville/Castlewood Field Aerodrome, in Ontario
 Castlewood Lake, a major lake in Biggar, Saskatchewan

Other
 Castlewood Orb Drive, a removable storage disk drive
 Castlewood - the name of fictional locations (in Hampshire and in Virginia) in novels by William Makepeace Thackeray